= National Network of Informal Workers in the Philippines =

Trade union of informal workers in the Philippines

PATAMABA
- National Network of Informal Workers in the Philippines
- Pambansang Kalipunan ng mga Manggagawang Impormal sa Pilipinas
- Founded: 1991
- Location: Philippines
- Members: 19,000 (2015)
- Key people: Lourdes Gula, President
- Website: patamaba.net

The National Network of Informal Workers in the Philippines (PATAMABA, Pambansang Kalipunan ng mga Manggagawang Impormal sa Pilipinas) is a trade union of informal workers, especially home-based workers, in the Philippines.

== Organisation ==
98 percent of PATAMABA's members are women, while more than half of them are home-based workers. Other affiliated groups include vendors, small transport operators, construction workers and service workers. They are organised in 12 regions, 34 provinces and 276 local chapters throughout the Philippines. The union supports its members in developing their own enterprises, participating in local politics, pursuing training and accessing social services.

== History ==
The National Network of Home-based Workers (Pambansang Tagapag-ugnay ng Manggagawa sa Bahay) was first launched in 1991. In 1992, PATAMABA succeeded in pressuring the Filipino government into affirming certain labour protections for home-based workers, including the registration of worker's organisations, the possibility of collective bargaining and the right to immediate payment.

During the 1990s, PATAMABA expanded from home-based work to other sectors of the informal economy. It was renamed to its current name in 2003, but kept the acronym.
